Perry Township is one of the eighteen townships of Columbiana County, Ohio, United States. The 2010 census reported 16,850 people living in the township, 4,551 of whom lived in the unincorporated portions of the township.

Geography
Located in the northern part of the county, it borders the following townships:
Green Township, Mahoning County - northeast
Salem Township - southeast
Butler Township - southwest
Goshen Township, Mahoning County - northwest

It is the most northerly township in Columbiana County.

One city is located in Perry Township:
The city of Salem, in the center

The census-designated place of Salem Heights is on the western edge of the township, along U.S. Route 62 (West State Street).

Name and history

Perry Township is named for Oliver Hazard Perry, hero of the Battle of Lake Erie. It is one of twenty-six Perry Townships statewide.

The township was organized in 1832. Four sections of Green, four sections of Salem, four sections from Goshen and four sections of Butler townships, all then in Columbiana County, were given to the  new township.

Government
The township is governed by a three-member board of trustees, who are elected in November of odd-numbered years to a four-year term beginning on the following January 1. Two are elected in the year after the presidential election and one is elected in the year before it. There is also an elected township fiscal officer, who serves a four-year term beginning on April 1 of the year after the election, which is held in November of the year before the presidential election. Vacancies in the fiscal officership or on the board of trustees are filled by the remaining trustees.

Township Trustees
James Armeni Sr., Vice Chairman
Don Rudibaugh,
Steven J. Bailey, Chairman

Fiscal Officer
John C. Volio

References

External links
Township website
County website

Townships in Columbiana County, Ohio
Townships in Ohio
1832 establishments in Ohio
Populated places established in 1832